Damian Hampson (born 27 March 1970) is a former Australian rules footballer who played with the West Coast Eagles in the Australian Football League (AFL).

Hampson was a "Best and Fairest" winner at Subiaco in 1990, the club for which his father Reg played 200 WAFL games. He had earlier represented Australia at youth level tennis and competed against the likes of Richard Fromberg and Jason Stoltenberg, taking a set off the latter on a few occasions. As a footballer he was a hard running midfielder and was picked up by Carlton in the first round of the 1990 AFL draft.

After 21 games in the reserves and without making it into the seniors, Hampson was offloaded to West Coast at the end of the 1992 AFL season. He made four league appearances in 1993 without establishing a permanent place for himself in what was a strong team. Hampson managed to break back into the side late in the 1994 season but lost his spot by the time finals came, with the Eagles claiming their second premiership.

References

1970 births
West Coast Eagles players
Subiaco Football Club players
Living people
Australian rules footballers from Western Australia